"Hit Me Off" is a song by American R&B group New Edition, released in July 1996 as the first single from the group's sixth studio album, Home Again (1996). It was also the group's first single in seven years. The song featured lead vocals from all six New Edition members. It samples "Storm King" by Bob James, "I Got Cha Opin" by Black Moon, and "One Nation Under a Groove" by Funkadelic.

"Hit Me Off" debuted at a peak of number three on the US Billboard Hot 100 while topping the Billboard Hot R&B Singles chart for three weeks, their fifth number-one hit on the listing. It sold 600,000 copies domestically and was certified gold by the Recording Industry Association of America. It was also certified gold in New Zealand, where it reached number two. The song was performed along with "I'm Still in Love with You" on the TV series "Family Matters".

Critical reception
Larry Flick from Billboard described the song as "a smoker". He added, "Vocally, time has treated the lads extremely well. The high-pitched squeak and tenor harmonies have been replaced by swarthy machismo and mature baritone. Despite the individual styles developed via solo careers, the act's chemistry is well intact, and the members appear to have fallen into group mode with ease. They make excellent use of Silky's chilled jeep/funk groove (which pops with a cool sample from Blackmoon's "I Gotcha Opin") and seductive chorus chant. Needless to say, this is a smash. Jam on it."

Track listing
 "Hit Me Off" (N.E. Spyder and Shaq D) – 6:00
 "Hit Me Off" (The Trackmasters E.C. Joint) – 4:27
 "Hit Me Off" ("G" Formulated Mix)(Version) – 5:01
 "Hit Me Off" (Franktified Club Version) – 7:34
 "Hit Me Off" (LP Version) – 4:21

Personnel
 Ronnie DeVoe – rap, background vocals
 Bobby Brown – lead and background vocals
 Ricky Bell – lead and background vocals
 Michael Bivins – rap, background vocals
 Ralph Tresvant – lead and background vocals
 Johnny Gill – lead and background vocals

Charts

Weekly charts

Year-end charts

Certifications

Release history

See also
 R&B number-one hits of 1996 (USA)

References

1996 singles
1996 songs
MCA Records singles
Music videos directed by Joseph Kahn
New Edition songs
Songs written by Michael Bivins
Songs written by Ronnie DeVoe